Daniel, Dan, or Danny White may refer to:

Sports
 Dan White (quarterback) (born 1972), football quarterback for the University of Arizona Wildcats
 Dan White (rugby union) (born 1989), rugby union player
 Danny White (born 1952), former football quarterback with the Dallas Cowboys
 Danny White (athletic director) (born c. 1980), university athletic director

Politics 
 Dan White (1946–1985), San Francisco politician, assassin
 Dan White (Ohio politician), former Ohio House of Representatives member
 Daniel Appleton White (1776–1861), American statesman, lawyer, and judge
 Daniel Price White (1814–1890), Confederate politician

Others
Dan White (actor) (1908–1980), American actor in westerns
Dan White (magician) (born 1981), American magician
Daniel White (general) (1833–1895), Union general in the American Civil War from the state of Maine
Daniel R. White (born 1953), American lawyer, writer, editor, humorist
Danny White (musician), British keyboardist
Danny White (New Orleans musician) (1931–1996), R&B singer and bandleader

See also
Daniel Whyte (disambiguation)